Sarolta Lukacs (née Mathe) is a female Hungarian former international table tennis player.

Table tennis career
She won two bronze medals at the World Table Tennis Championships, in the Corbillon Cup (women's team event).

See also
 List of table tennis players
 List of World Table Tennis Championships medalists

References

Hungarian female table tennis players
World Table Tennis Championships medalists